Lincolnshire Historic District is a national historic district located at Evansville, Indiana. The district developed after 1923, and encompasses 95 contributing buildings in a predominantly residential section of Evansville.  The district's homes have a mixture of Tudor Revival and Old and new World revival designs, including Colonial Revival. St. Benedict Cathedral and Bosse High School are two landmark buildings from the 1920s and 1930s.

It was listed on the National Register of Historic Places in 1989.

Gallery

References

Historic districts on the National Register of Historic Places in Indiana
Colonial Revival architecture in Indiana
Tudor Revival architecture in Indiana
Geography of Evansville, Indiana
Historic districts in Evansville, Indiana
National Register of Historic Places in Evansville, Indiana